I Pagliacci is a 1915 Italian silent drama film directed by Francesco Bertolini. It is based on the 1892 opera Pagliacci by Ruggero Leoncavallo.

Cast
 Bianca Virginia Camagni 
 Paolo Colaci 
 Giulia Costa 
 Annibale Ninchi 
 Achille Vitti 
 Umberto Zanuccoli

References

Bibliography
 Goble, Alan. The Complete Index to Literary Sources in Film. Walter de Gruyter, 1999.

External links

1915 films
1910s Italian-language films
Films directed by Francesco Bertolini
Italian silent feature films
Films based on operas
Italian black-and-white films
Italian drama films
1915 drama films
Silent drama films